Alyutor or Alutor is a language of Russia that belongs to the Chukotkan branch of the Chukotko-Kamchatkan languages.

Sociolinguistic situation 
The Alutor are the indigenous inhabitants of the northern part of the Kamchatka Peninsula. The language is unwritten and moribund; in the 1970s residents of the chief Alutor village of Vyvenka under the age of 25 did not know the language. In recent years the Vyvenka village school has started teaching the language. Until 1958 the language was considered the "village" (settled) dialect of the Koryak language, but it is not intelligible with traditionally nomadic varieties of Koryak. The autonym  means "villager".

Orthography

Typology
Alutor is a polysynthetic language.

The morphology is agglutinative, with extensive prefixes and suffixes.

The argument structure is ergative.

The word order is variable, and it is difficult to say which typology is basic. The verb-absolutive orders AVO and VAO are perhaps most common.

Phonology

Vowels 
Alyutor has six vowels, five of which may be long or short. The schwa  cannot be long.

Consonants 
There are 18 consonants in Alyutor.

Stress 
Stress generally falls on the second syllable of polysyllabic words, and on the first syllable of disyllabic words, e.g.:
 
 'water',  'skin',  'to feed',  'husband',  'mukluk'.

An open syllable containing schwa cannot be stressed. As a consequence, if a disyllabic term begins with such a syllable, the stress is shifted to the last syllable and thereafter a new, epenthetic syllable is added at the end, e.g.:

* ->  'mosquito'.

The final syllable of a word is never stressed.

Syllable structure 
All Alyutor syllables begin with a single consonant. If the vowel is short, including a schwa, they may also close with a single consonant. Consonant clusters are not permitted in the word initial or word final positions. The schwa is used to brake disallowed clusters.

Examples are  'to work',  'eagle',  'parka'.

Alyutor word boundaries always coincide with syllable boundaries.

Morphology 
Alyutor has the following parts of speech: nouns, adjectives, numerals, pronouns, verbs, participles, adverbs, postpositions, conjunctions, and particles.

Nouns 
Nouns are inflected for number, case, definiteness, and grammatical person.

There are three grammatical numbers: singular, dual and plural.

There are eleven cases: absolutive, ergative, locative, dative, lative, prolative, contractive, causative, equative, comitative, and associative.

Number and case are expressed using a single affix. A suffix is used for all cases except the comitative and associative, which are expressed using circumfixes. There are two declensions, taught as three noun classes. The first class are nonhuman nouns of the first declension. Number is only distinguished in the absolutive case, though verbal agreement may distinguish number when these nouns are in the ergative. The second class are proper names and kin terms for elders. They are second declension, and distinguish number in the ergative, locative, and lative cases, as well as the absolutive. The third class are the other human nouns; they may be either first or second declension.

Case roles 
The absolutive case is the citation form of a noun. It is used for the argument ("subject") of an intransitive clause and the object of a transitive clause, for "syntactic possessives", and for the vocative.
The ergative is used for the agent ("subject") of a transitive verb, as an instrumental case, and as the argument of an antipassive clause.
The locative is used for position and direction (essive and lative cases), as well as arguments which are "driven away", e.g.:

The dative is used for recipients, benefactors, directional objects (allative case), and subjects of experiential verbs
Lative is used for motion toward a goal
Prolative is used for movement along and movement from (perlative and elative cases)
 Equative is used with the meanings 'like X', 'as X', usually with verbs like 'to become', 'to turn into', 'to work as,' etc.
 Contactive is used for objects that make contact
 Causative is used for noun phrases that cause or motivate an action
 Comitative is used for ... . It is primarily used with high-animacy referents.
 Associative is used for secondary or passive accompaniment.  It is only attested in the declension of nouns of the first declension, usually inanimate.

Grammatical person 
Grammatical first and second person suffixes on nouns are used to equate a noun with participants in the discourse. They only appear in the absolutive, with an intervening j on nouns ending in a vowel and an i on nouns ending in a consonant.

 …ʡopta am-ʡujamtawilʔ-ə-muru "yes we the people"
 japlə=q ʡujamtawilʔ-iɣəm "and I'm a man"

Numerals 
Alyutor has simple numerals for the numbers one to five, ten, and twenty. All other numbers are compounds based on these numerals.

Verbs
There are finite (conjugated) and non-finite verbs. There are several conjugations.

Polypersonal conjugation
Finite verbs agree in person and number with their nuclear arguments; agreement is through both prefixes and suffixes. Transitive verbs agree with both arguments (ergative and absolutive), whereas intransitive verbs agree with their sole (absolutive) argument.

Verbs distinguish two aspects, perfective, the bare stem, and imperfective, using the suffix -tkə / -tkəni. There are five moods, indicative, imperative, optative, potential (marked by the circumfix ta…(ŋ)), and conjunctive (prefix ʔ-/a-).

Monopersonal conjugation 
Monopersonal verbs include two conjugations, one with the third-person singular in ɣa-...-lin, and the other in n-...-qin.

Impersonal conjugation 
For impersonal forms of conjugation include verbal predicate (formed with the circumfix a…ka) and imperative (formed by circumfix ɣa…a/ta). Non-finite forms Impersonal forms include the verbal predicate with the circumfix a…ka, and the imperative in ɣa…a/ta.

Non-finite forms 
These include the infinitive, supine, gerunds, and participles.

References

Bibliography
Kibrik, A.E., S.V. Kodzasov, I.A. Murav'eva. 2000. Jazyk i fol'klor aljutorcev. Moscow: IMLI RAN Nasledie. 
Nagayama, Yukari. 2003. Ocherk grammatiki aljutorskogo jazyka (ELPR Publication Series A2-038). Osaka: Osaka Gakuin University.

External links

 The Aliutors
 The Aliutor Language
 Alutor: Bibliographical guide

Agglutinative languages
Chukotko-Kamchatkan languages
Languages of Russia
Subject–verb–object languages
Endangered languages
Languages written in Cyrillic script